Johanna Ulrika Ekström (9 May 1970 – 13 April 2022) was a Swedish author and artist.

Ekström made her published debut in 1993 with a collection of poems called Skiffer, and the following year she had her first exhibition at Galleri Charlotte Lund in Stockholm. Ekström published a dozen collections of poems and short stories as well as novels.

Biography
Ekström grew up in Stockholm, the daughter of the authors Per Wästberg and Margareta Ekström.

She made her writing debut in 1993 with the collection of poems Skiffer ("Slate"), and continued to publish poetry during the 1990s. After the turn of the millennium in 2000, she began writing short stories, novels, and diary entries. Her first collection of short stories, What Do I Know About Strength, was published in 2000.  Her first published novel was Farewell Relay (2004), which was followed by the short story collection Look, she crawls. Ekström became better known as a writer through his autobiographical works. The autobiographical If You Stay in the Sun (2012) describes growing up in a bourgeois and intellectual home on Djurgården. Her previous diaries were published in 2016 under the title Diary 1996–2002. Her latest book, The Sentences from 2000, depicts the relationship with her mother, after her mother had difficulty speaking due to a stroke in the 1990s.

As an artist, Johanna Ekström had her first exhibition at Galleri Charlotte Lund in 1994. Her work as a visual artist was closely linked to her poetry. In 2012, she had her first exhibition at Björkholmen Gallery and was subsequently represented by the gallery. She also exhibited at the Gothenburg Art Museum and Färgfabriken on Liljeholmen.

Personal life
For a time, she was cohabiting with author Tomas Lappalainen and had a daughter with him.

Ekström died of cancer on 13 April 2022, at the age of 51.

Bibliography 
 Skiffer (1993)
 Vitöga: dikter (1994)
 Rachels hus: dikter (1995)
 Fiktiva dagboken (1997)
 Gå förlorad: dikter (1998)
 Brott, with Erik Pauser (1998)
 Vad vet jag om hållfasthet (2000)
 Jag ska vakna stående  (2003)
 Avskedsstafetten (2004)
 Titta, hon kryper (2006)
 Det enda främmande  (2008)
 Om man håller sig i solen (2012)
 Dagbok 1996-2002 (2016)
 Meningarna (2020)

References

1970 births
2022 deaths
20th-century Swedish poets
20th-century Swedish women writers
21st-century Swedish poets
21st-century Swedish women writers
Swedish women poets
Deaths from cancer in Sweden